Klijn is a Dutch family name.

People named Klijn include:
Albertus Frederik Johannes Klijn (1923–2012), Dutch scholar of New Testament Apocrypha
Lorena Klijn (born 1987), Dutch kickboxer
Marti Sarigul-Klijn, US pilot of Turkish-Dutch descent

On the Dutch and German Wikipedias:
:nl:Albert Klijn (1895–81) Dutch artist
:nl:Corné Klijn (1961), Dutch radio DJ
:de:Debbie Klijn (1975), Dutch handball player
:nl:Judith de Klijn (1967), Dutch TV
:nl:René Klijn (1962–93), Dutch boygroup singer and male model
:nl:Tim Klijn (1979), Dutch DJ

Luis Navarro Klijn surgeon in Peru, Peruvian- Dutch descent (1925)

See also
Klein (disambiguation)

Dutch-language surnames